Niranjan Prasad Chakravarti  (1 July 1893 – 19 October 1956) was an Indian archaeologist who served as Chief epigraphist to the Government of India in 1934 to 1940 and as Director-general of the Archaeological Survey of India from 1948 to 1950.

Early life and education 

Chakravarti was born on 1 July 1893 at Krishnanagar in the Nadia district of Bengal Presidency, India. After graduation, he served as lecturer of Sanskrit and Pali at the University of Calcutta. After working at Sorbonne in Paris and Berlin universities on a scholarship in 1921, Chakravarti went to the United Kingdom and obtained a doctorate from the University of Cambridge in 1926.

Career 

Chakravarti returned to India in 1929 and joined as Assistant Superintendent for Epigraphy at Ootacamund. In 1934, he was promoted to the post of Chief Epigraphist for the Government of India. In 1940, he was promoted to Deputy Director-General of the Archaeological Survey of India becoming Joint Director-General in 1945. In 1948, Chakravarti succeeded Mortimer Wheeler as the Director General of the ASI serving in his position till 1950.

Later life 

Following his retirement, Chakravarti was appointed advisor to the Department of Archaeology, Government of India and served till 1952. Chakravarti died on 19 October 1956 in New Delhi.

References 

 

1893 births
1956 deaths
Officers of the Order of the British Empire
Directors General of the Archaeological Survey of India
People from Nadia district
Scientists from West Bengal
20th-century Indian archaeologists
Indian institute directors
Indian epigraphers
Indian archaeologists
Indian historians
20th-century Indian historians
20th-century Bengalis
Bengali Hindus
Bengali historians